Édouard-Pierre-Marie Chassaignac (24 December 1804 – 26 August 1879) was a French physician.  He was born in Nantes and in 1835 became prosector and professor at the university and physician at the central bureau of the hospitals of Paris.  He originated the surgical operation known as écrasement, by means of which tumors, piles, polypi, and other growths may be removed without the effusion of blood. The general introduction of drainage in surgery is also due to his initiative. He introduced the use of drainage tubes into surgery.

Written works 
He wrote Traité de l'écrasement linéaire (1856); Leçons sur la trachéométrie (1855); Clinique chirurgicale (1854–58); Traité pratique de la suppuration et du drainage chirurgical (two volumes, 1859). With Gustave-Antoine Richelot (1806-1893) he published a French translation of the surgical works of Astley Cooper, Oeuvres chirurgicales complètes d’Astley Cooper.

Terms
Chassaignac's tubercle — the strongly developed anterior tubercle of the transverse process of the sixth cervical vertebra:  called also carotid tubercle.  
Dorland's Medical Dictionary (1938)

References

 
 Sir Astley Paston  Cooper @ Who Named It

French surgeons
1804 births
1879 deaths